Gżira United Football Club is a Maltese professional football club from the small harbor town of Gżira in central Malta, which currently plays in the Maltese Premier League.

History
The club was founded in 1947, won the FA Trophy in 1973 and First Division league Champions. Often plays in Maroon with light blue sleeves on the shirt, with white shorts and white socks. Following the club's promotion to the Maltese Premier League, they signed a sponsorship agreement with JEEP, the global SUV brand, with the agreement of organizing events for the local community. For the 2016–17 season the Club played in BOV Premier League for the first time ever and finished 7th place. In the following year 2017–18 the maroons placed 3rd place and participated for the first time in the UEFA Europa League. The 2018–19 season was another successful one where again Gżira placed 3rd place and assured themselves to play again in the Europa League for another time.

The Hajduk miracle
On 18 July 2019, Gżira were facing the big Croatian club Hajduk Split at Split for the second leg of the first qualifying round of the 2019–20 UEFA Europa League. Gżira had lost the first leg match at home 0–2, a result which was considered normal, due to the big budget differences between the two clubs. The match in Split had the Croatians as strong favorites, offering odds of 1/15 (1.07 in decimal odds) for Hajduk to win the match. Hajduk went at half time winning 1–0. However, Brazilian forward Jefferson equalized for Gżira at the 57th minute, and Hamed Koné scored at the 69th minute making the score 1–2 for Gżira. This result was still not enough for the Maltese side, but found a final goal in the sixth and last minute of injury time, again with Hamed Koné, making the score 1–3 for Gżira, with the Maltese side advancing on away goals rule. This result was considered a major shock for the Croatians, with their manager Siniša Oreščanin being sacked shortly after.

Qualifying for the UEFA Conference League 3rd Round
In season 2021/22 UEFA started a new competition, the UEFA Conference League. Gzira qualified after placing 3rd in the Maltese Premier League and in the first round they eliminated again Santa Julia of Andorra. In the second round they faced Rijeka of Croatia and were eliminated with an aggregate of 3-0. 
In season 2022/23 Gzira played again in the same competition and in the first round they eliminated Atletic Club Escaldes of Andorra. In the second round Gzira FC were drawn against Radnicki Nis of Serbia and Gzira shocked again the European football when eliminating this strong side from Serbia. For the first time Gzira United FC played in the 3rd round of a European Competition and played against Austrian giants of Wolfsberger. Gzira obtained a goalless draw in Austria but then they were eliminated in the home match.

Players

Current squad

Notable players

  Caio Garcia
  Souleymane Diamouténé
  Haruna Garba
  Andrew Cohen
  Roderick Briffa
  Justin Haber
  Hamed Kone
  Amadou Samb
  Rodolfo Soares
  Robert de Pinho de Souza

Executive Board

Chairman                  Sharlon Pace

Vice Chairman             Roberto Cristiano

Chief Executive Officer   Edward Zammit Tabona

General Secretary         Dr Ian Micallef

Chief Financial Officer   Alexander Cassar

Personnel

Technical staff

Major Honours 

Maltese FA Trophy 1 1972–73

European record

References

External links
Soccerway profile
Gzira United F.C. Official Website

 
Association football clubs established in 1947
Football clubs in Malta
1947 establishments in Malta